is a passenger railway station in located in the city of  Tsu, Mie Prefecture, Japan, operated by Central Japan Railway Company (JR Tōkai).

Lines
Ise-Ōi Station is served by the Meishō Line, and is 18.5 rail kilometers from the terminus of the line at Matsusaka Station.

Station layout
The station consists of a single side platform serving bi-directional traffic. There is no station building, but a small structure located on the platform. The station is unattended.

Platforms

Adjacent stations

History 
Ise-Ōi Station was opened on January 20, 1938 as a station on the Japanese Government Railways (JGR), which became the Japan National Railways (JNR) after World War II. Freight operations were discontinued in October 1965. Along with its division and privatization of JNR on April 1, 1987, the station came under the control and operation of the Central Japan Railway Company.

Passenger statistics
In fiscal 2019, the station was used by an average of 8 passengers daily (boarding passengers only).

Surrounding area
Ise-Nakagawa Country Club

See also
 List of railway stations in Japan

References

External links

JR Central home page

Railway stations in Japan opened in 1938
Railway stations in Mie Prefecture
Tsu, Mie